The 1995–96 Maryland Terrapins men's basketball team represented the University of Maryland in the 1995–1996 college basketball season as a member of the Atlantic Coast Conference (ACC). The team was led by head coach Gary Williams and played their home games at the Cole Field House. The team finished 17–13, 8–8 in ACC play and lost in the semifinals of the ACC tournament to Georgia Tech. The Terps received an at-large bid as the No. 7 seed in the West region of the 1996 NCAA tournament, where they lost to Santa Clara, led by Steve Nash (28 points), in the opening round.

Roster

Schedule and results 

|-
!colspan=11 style=| Regular season

|-
!colspan=11 style=| ACC tournament

|-
!colspan=11 style=| 1996 NCAA Men's Basketball tournament

Rankings

References

Maryland Terrapins men's basketball seasons
Maryland
Maryland
Maryland
Maryland